is a Japanese former swimmer. He competed in the men's 200 metre butterfly at the 1960 Summer Olympics.

References

External links
 

1941 births
Living people
Olympic swimmers of Japan
Swimmers at the 1960 Summer Olympics
Sportspeople from Ishikawa Prefecture
Asian Games medalists in swimming
Asian Games gold medalists for Japan
Swimmers at the 1962 Asian Games
Medalists at the 1962 Asian Games
Japanese male butterfly swimmers
20th-century Japanese people